Reginald Harold Beresford (3 June 1921 – 14 October 2021) was an English professional footballer who appeared in the Football League for Crystal Palace as a forward or wing half.

Career 
Beresfored began his youth career at Aston Villa in 1938 and in 1946, signed for Birmingham City. He did not make an appearance for Birmingham and in August 1948, signed for Crystal Palace then playing in the Third Division South. He made his debut in the opening match of the season in a 1–5 defeat away to Reading and went on to make seven appearances in the first half of the season, scoring once in a 3–1 home win over Watford in September. In May 1949 Beresford left Crystal Palace having made seven appearances scoring once.

Personal life 
Beresford died in October 2021 aged 100.

References

External links 
 Beresford at holmesdale.net
 Stats at neilbrown.com

1921 births
2021 deaths
English footballers
English Football League players
Aston Villa F.C. players
Birmingham City F.C. players
Crystal Palace F.C. players
Association football forwards
Association football midfielders
English centenarians
Men centenarians
Sportspeople from Walsall